is a Japanese footballer who plays for Fujieda MYFC.

Club statistics
Updated to 23 February 2018.

References

External links
Profile at Fujieda MYFC

Profile at Gainare Tottori

1989 births
Living people
Nihon University alumni
Association football people from Shizuoka Prefecture
Japanese footballers
J2 League players
J3 League players
Gainare Tottori players
Fujieda MYFC players
Association football goalkeepers